Loss is the sixth studio album by British musician, songwriter and producer Steven Wilson released under the pseudonym Bass Communion, and was limited to only 450 copies on vinyl. The original pressing featured a scented inner sleeve.

The album consists of a title track split in two parts. It was re-issued shortly after, in a CD+DVD-A edition containing both Stereo and 5.1 Surround mixes. In February 2009, it was also re-issued as a limited edition 12" picture disc vinyl version of 500 copies.

Track listing

Vinyl and picture disc
Side A
 Loss - Part 1 - 19:52
Side B
 Loss - Part 2 - 19:11

CD (stereo mix)
 Loss - Part 1 - 19:52
 Loss - Part 2 - 19:11

DVDA (5.1 surround sound mix)
 Loss - Part 1 - 19:52
 Loss - Part 2 - 19:11

Release history

Credits
Created by Steven Wilson

Special thanks to Lasse Hoile
Sleeve Design by Carl Glover for Aleph

References

External links
Bass Communion Site at Steven Wilson Headquarters

2006 albums
Bass Communion albums